The Bukit Merah railway station was a Malaysian train station located at and named after the town of Bukit Merah, Perak. It was closed and demolished in 2010 to give way for the construction Ipoh-Padang Besar electrified and double-tracking project.

Defunct railway stations in Malaysia